Dick or Richard Duckworth may refer to:

Dick Duckworth (footballer, born 1882), English football player
Dick Duckworth (footballer, born 1906) (1906–1983), English footballer and manager
Richard Duckworth (campanologist)
Richard John Duckworth, officer in the Indian Air Force
Richard Duckworth of the Duckworth baronets